Convoy HX 133 was the 133rd of the numbered series of World War II HX convoys of merchant ships from HalifaX to Liverpool. The ships departed Halifax on 16 June 1941, and were found on 23 June by U-boats of the 1st U-boat Flotilla, operating out of Brest, France.
U-boats sank six ships before the convoy reached Liverpool on 3 July. There was strong criticism of the RCN corvette's signalling capabilities as borne out by the number of collisions that occurred.

Ships in the Convoy

References

Bibliography
 

HX133
Naval battles of World War II involving Canada